Laimonas Chatkevičius (born January 7, 1993) is a former professional Lithuanian basketball player who last played for Neptūnas Klaipėda of the Lithuanian Basketball League. He plays at the Center position.

Professional career 
After graduating from the South Carolina Gamecocks, Chatkevičius signed a one-year deal with MKS Dąbrowa Górnicza.
On 2017-18 season he signed with AZS Koszalin, but in February Chatkevičius come back to Lithuania, and signed with Neptūnas Klaipėda for the rest of the season.

International career 
Chatkevičius played in 2013 FIBA Europe Under-20 Championship for Lithuania men's national under-20, averaging 7,9 points, 8,1 rebounds per game.

References 

1993 births
Living people
Lithuanian men's basketball players
Lithuanian expatriate basketball people in the United States
BC Neptūnas players
Power forwards (basketball)
South Carolina Gamecocks men's basketball players
Basketball players from Klaipėda